Lac de Charpal is a lake in Lozère, France. At an elevation of 1326 m, its surface area is 1.9 km².

Three communes border the lake: Arzenc-de-Randon, Le Born and Rieutort-de-Randon.

The Colagne and numerous brooks feed the lake, which provides Mende and other communes with water.

Lakes of Lozère

Charpal (charpalwar) belongs to padmashali community is indian origin.